D-glycero-beta-D-manno-heptose-7-phosphate kinase (heptose 7-phosphate kinase, D-beta-D-heptose 7-phosphotransferase, D-beta-D-heptose-7-phosphate kinase, HldE1 heptokinase, glycero-manno-heptose 7-phosphate kinase, D-beta-D-heptose 7-phosphate kinase/D-beta-D-heptose 1-phosphate adenylyltransferase, hldE (gene), rfaE (gene)) is an enzyme with systematic name ATP:D-glycero-beta-D-manno-heptose 7-phosphate 1-phosphotransferase. This enzyme catalyses the following chemical reaction

 D-glycero-beta-D-manno-heptose 7-phosphate + ATP  D-glycero-beta-D-manno-heptose 1,7-bisphosphate + ADP

The bifunctional protein hldE includes D-glycero-beta-D-manno-heptose-7-phosphate kinase and D-glycero-beta-D-manno-heptose 1-phosphate adenylyltransferase activity (cf. EC 2.7.7.70).

References

External links 
 

EC 2.7.1